San Esteban de la Dóriga is one of 28 parishes (administrative divisions) in Salas, a municipality within the province and autonomous community of Asturias, in northern Spain.

Villages
 Bulse 
 Castiello (El Castiellu) 
 La Rodriga
 Reconco (Reconcu) 
 San Esteban (Saniesta) 
 Villar

References

Parishes in Salas